William Osborne Perkins II (January 12, 1941 – February 5, 2016) was an American football running back in the American Football League for the New York Jets; he played college football at the University of Iowa. After his football career he became an attorney and politician who served two terms in the New Jersey General Assembly.

Early years
Perkins attended Henry Snyder High School, where he practiced football and track. He accepted a football scholarship from the University of Iowa. As a junior, he played fullback, registering 62 carries for 380 yards (led the team) and 2 rushing touchdowns. His 6.1-yard average led the team and was second in the Big Ten Conference.

As a senior, he was third on the team with 48 carries for 237 yards (4.0-yard avg.) and no touchdowns. He finished his college career with 110 carries for 617 yards, a 5.6-yard average and 2 rushing touchdowns.

Professional career
Perkins was selected by the Dallas Cowboys in the 12th round (160th overall) of the 1963 NFL Draft. He was waived in September.

In September 1963, he was signed to the New York Jets' taxi squad. On November 1, he was promoted to the regular roster. He was a backup halfback and kickoff returner. He was released on September 8, 1964.

Personal life
His uncle was Don Perkins, who also played running back in the NFL. Bill Perkins graduated from Seton Hall Law School in 1968. He was fluent in English, Spanish, Russian, French, and Polish.

He was a criminal defense attorney and opened his law office in 1970. He represented Bayonne and Jersey City (the 31st district) in the New Jersey General Assembly from 1974 to 1978. He was the first African American president of the Hudson County Bar Association. He was disbarred by the NJ Supreme Court in 2000 by consent. in He also was an assistant football coach at Saint Peter's College. In 2001, he was named the assistant director for the New Jersey Recreation Department, where he worked until 2010. On February 5, 2016, he died in Teaneck, survived by four children, including businessman Bill Perkins.

References

External links

1941 births
2016 deaths
Henry Snyder High School alumni
Politicians from Jersey City, New Jersey
Players of American football from Jersey City, New Jersey
American football running backs
Iowa Hawkeyes football players
New York Jets players
American Football League players
Seton Hall University School of Law alumni
African-American state legislators in New Jersey
Democratic Party members of the New Jersey General Assembly
20th-century African-American people
21st-century African-American people